Debra Moody (born May 28, 1956) is an American politician and a Republican member of the Tennessee House of Representatives representing District 81 since January 8, 2013.

Education
Moody attended Arkansas State University and the University of Memphis.

Elections
2012 When District 81 incumbent Democratic Representative Jimmy Naifeh retired and left the seat open, Moody ran in the four-way August 2, 2012 Republican Primary, winning with 2,578 votes (44.5%) and won the three-way November 6, 2012 General election with 12,690 votes (55.8%) against Democratic nominee Conneye Albright and Independent candidate Tommy Hill.

References

External links
Official page at the Tennessee General Assembly
Campaign site

Debra Moody at Ballotpedia
Debra Moody at OpenSecrets

Place of birth missing (living people)
1956 births
Living people
Arkansas State University alumni
Republican Party members of the Tennessee House of Representatives
People from Covington, Tennessee
University of Memphis alumni
Women state legislators in Tennessee
21st-century American politicians
21st-century American women politicians